Ocracoke Island Airport  is a public use airport located one nautical mile (2 km) east of the central business district of Ocracoke, a town on Ocracoke Island in Hyde County, North Carolina, United States. It located in the Cape Hatteras National Seashore, owned by U.S. National Park Service, and operated by the North Carolina Department of Transportation. This airport is included in the National Plan of Integrated Airport Systems for 2011–2015, which categorized it as a general aviation facility.

Facilities and aircraft 
Ocracoke Island Airport covers an area of 50 acres (20 ha) at an elevation of 5 feet (2 m) above mean sea level. It has one runway designated 6/24 with an asphalt surface measuring 2,999 by 60 feet (914 x 18 m). It also has one helipad designated H1 with a concrete surface measuring 100 by 100 feet (30 x 30 m).

For the 12-month period ending September 9, 2009, the airport had 6,110 aircraft operations, an average of 16 per day: 98% general aviation, 2% air taxi, and <1% military.

References

External links 
  at North Carolina DOT airport guide
 Aerial image as of March 1993 from USGS The National Map
 
 

Airports in North Carolina
Transportation in Hyde County, North Carolina
Buildings and structures in Hyde County, North Carolina
National Park Service